Bristersburg is an unincorporated community in Fauquier County.  It is in the southern part of the county, centered on State Route 806 and State Route 616.  The village is near Prince William County and Stafford County.

The Bristersburg Historic District was listed on the National Register of Historic Places in 2009.

References

Unincorporated communities in Fauquier County, Virginia
Unincorporated communities in Virginia